This is a list of footballers notable for their contributions to Inverness Caledonian Thistle, from the formation of the club in 1994 to present. It generally includes only players who made more than 100 league appearances for the club, but some players with fewer than 100 appearances are also included. This includes players who represented their national team while with the club, and players who have set a club record, such as most appearances, most goals or biggest transfer fee.

Notable players 

Bold type indicates that the player currently plays for the club.
Updated 28 May 2022

Key to positions
 GK — Goalkeeper
 DF — Defender
 MF — Midfielder
 FW — Forward

Notes

References

External links 
 
Inverness CT at Soccerbase

Statistics: Inverness CT

Players
 
Inverness Caledonian Thistle
Players
Association football player non-biographical articles